Johan Reinhold Norstedt (1 July 1843, Västra Vingåker Parish, Södermanland - 15 December 1911, Stockholm) was a Swedish landscape and portrait painter.

Biography
His father, Christian Norstedt, was a mill operator. His mother, Emilia Albertina née Duse was an amateur musician. He was a student at the lyceum in Norrköping from 1853 to 1864.

When he returned to Sweden, he worked as a singing teacher at the Royal Swedish Opera, but continued to study art. The landscape painter, Alfred Wahlberg, encouraged him to pursue art as a career.

In 1875, he married a painter, Anna Katharina Munthe. They honeymooned in Paris, and he took lessons in croquis from Joseph-Nicolas Robert-Fleury, but it was only during his third visit, in 1878, that he finally decided to focus on becoming an artist. He was initially a pupil of Henri Harpignies, who was also a printmaker. The Barbizon School had a strong influence on his work, but he sought to avoid being a mere imitator. He had his début at the Salon in 1879.

In 1881, he returned to Stockholm, and would live there for the rest of his life.

A memorial exhibition was held in Stockholm in 1912; and a retrospective in 1937.

Sources 
 Biography and references @ the Svenskt Biografiskt Lexikon 
 Biography of Norstedt @ the Lexikonett Amanda
 "Norstedt, Reinhold". In: Hans Vollmer (Ed.): Allgemeines Lexikon der Bildenden Künstler von der Antike bis zur Gegenwart, Vol.25: Moehring–Olivié. E. A. Seemann, Leipzig 1931, pg.520

External links

 More works by Norstedt @ ArtNet

1843 births
1911 deaths
Swedish painters
Swedish landscape painters
People from Södermanland